Neapolis or Caryanda Neapolis (Karyanda Neapolis) was a coastal town of ancient Caria. It was located near ancient Myndus and modern Göl. Neapolis was successor of Caryanda, when it was moved early in the 3d century.

References

Populated places in ancient Caria
Former populated places in Turkey